Thomas Emil Homerin (19 May 1955 – 26 December 2020) was an American scholar of religion. He was Professor of Religion in the Department of Religion & Classics at the University of Rochester until his death in 2020, where he taught courses on Islam, classical Arabic literature, mysticism, and Mt. Hope Cemetery in Rochester.

Early life
Thomas Emil Homerin, who generally abbreviated his first name to "Th." for publication, was the son of Floyd and Miriam Homerin, and brother of John A. Homerin.  While growing up in Pekin, Illinois, Homerin attended Douglas Elementary School, Washington Junior High School, and Pekin Community High School.  He was a graduate of the University of Illinois at Urbana-Champaign (B.A. '77, M.A. '78), and completed his Ph.D. with honors at the University of Chicago ('87).  Homerin married Nora Walter in 1977, and they have two sons, Luke (born 1987), and Elias (born 1991).

Career
A specialist in Arabic literature and Islam, Homerin had lived and worked in Egypt for a number of years.  Among his many publications are The Wine of Love & Life: Ibn al-Fârid's al-Khamrîyah and al-Qaysarî’s Quest for Meaning (Chicago, 2005), From Arab Poet to Muslim Saint (2nd revised edition, Cairo: American University Press, 2001) and his anthology of translations, Ibn al-Fârid: Sufi Verse & Saintly Life (New York, 2001) published as part of the esteemed Paulist Press series Classics in Western Spirituality. The last of these books features a cover painting by fellow former Pekinite Mark Staff Brandl. Homerin also authored several chapters on Islam in The Religious Foundations of Western Civilization (Abingdon Press, 2006), edited by Jacob Neusner.

Death and the afterlife were a major focus of Homerin's work, and he carried out field work in Cairo's al-Qarafah cemetery.  This initiated his interest in American funerary customs and practice which evolved into his course Speaking Stones on Mt. Hope Cemetery in Rochester, New York.  This course examines western funeral ritual and practice, with a particular focus on cemeteries in the United States, and how the iconography and epigraphy of graves and funerary monuments forge symbolic connections among the living and the dead.  Homerin and his students published the results of their research in Epitaph, the newsletter of the Friends of Mt. Hope Cemetery.

Recognition
Homerin was the recipient of grants from the Mrs. Giles Whiting Foundation, the Fulbright Foundation, the American Research Center in Egypt, and the National Endowment for the Humanities.  He also received a number of awards including the American Association of Teachers of Arabic Translation Prize, the Golden Key International Honour Society's recognition for his contributions to undergraduate education, the G. Granyon & Jane W. Curtis Award for Excellence in Nontenured Teaching, the University of Rochester's Teacher of the Year Award, and the Georgen Award for Distinguished Achievement and Artistry in Undergraduate Education.

References

External links
Official site
Speaking Stones - a course on Mt. Hope Cemetery
Epitaph
Memorial from the University of Rochester

University of Chicago alumni
University of Illinois Urbana-Champaign alumni
University of Rochester faculty
1955 births
2020 deaths
People from Pekin, Illinois
Fulbright alumni